A number of ships of the Royal Navy have been named Dundee, after the city in Scotland.

 HMS Dundee (1911), an armed boarding steamer of the First World War
 , a sloop of the Second World War

Royal Navy ship names